Rataje  is a village in the administrative district of Gmina Nowogródek Pomorski, within Myślibórz County, West Pomeranian Voivodeship, in northwestern Poland. It has a population of 70.

For the region's history, see History of Pomerania.

References

Rataje